Preeti Saran, born 5 September 1958, is an Indian civil servant of the Indian Foreign Service cadre 1982 batch. In December 2018, Saran was elected unopposed to the United Nations Committee on Economic, Social and Cultural Rights for a term from 1 January 2019 to 31 December 2022.

Personal life
Preeti Saran holds a B.A. (Honours) degree and Master of Arts degree in English from the Lady Shri Ram College for Women, University of Delhi. She is married to Pankaj Saran, who also belongs to the Indian Foreign Service and is the incumbent Deputy National Security Adviser of India. They have two sons.

Career
She joined the Indian Foreign Service in August 1982. She has served in Indian missions at Moscow, Dhaka, Cairo, Geneva, Toronto and Vietnam. Saran was the Consul General of India at Toronto and the Indian Ambassador to Vietnam. She served as the Secretary (East) in the Ministry of External Affairs, India from March 2016 to 30 September 2018.

From 1 January 2019 to 31 December 2022, Saran will be a member of the United Nations Committee on Economic, Social and Cultural Rights for a term from 1 January 2019 to 31 December 2022. She also acts as a mentor to Center for Strategic and Foreign Relations at Vision India Foundation.

References 

Living people
Indian Foreign Service officers
Indian women ambassadors
1958 births
Lady Shri Ram College alumni
Delhi University alumni
Ambassadors of India to Vietnam